Garry Koehler (23 May 1955 – 21 October 2019), born in Albury, was an Australian singer/songwriter, known for composing the 2006 hit, "The Man in the Picture", debut single for his award-winning band The Bobkatz. As co-founder, lead singer and guitarist with The Bobkatz who performed on the country music festival circuit, he was working on ideas for a new Bobkatz album when he died.

Awards

Tamworth Songwriters Awards
The Tamworth Songwriters Association (TSA) is an annual songwriting contest for original country songs, awarded in January at the Tamworth Country Music Festival. They commenced in 1986. Garry Koehler won four awards in that time.
 (wins only)
|-
|rowspan="2"| 2010
|rowspan="2"| "The Writer" by Garry Koehler
| Contemporary Song of the Year
| 
|-
| Country Song of the Year
| 
|-
|rowspan="2"|  2016
| "Spirit of the Frontier" by Garry Koehler
| Open Traditional Song of the Year
| 
|-
| "No White Card" by Garry Koehler
| Open Contemporary Song of the Year
| 
|-

References

External links
 

1955 births
2019 deaths
Australian songwriters